Videm is a place name and a surname that may refer to:

Places
In Italy:
 Udine, known as Videm in Slovene

In Slovenia:
 Krško, a settlement in the Municipality of Krško (known as Videm–Krško from 1953 to 1964), southeastern Slovenia
 Mali Videm, a settlement in the Municipality of Trebnje, southeastern Slovenia
 Municipality of Videm, a municipality, northeastern Slovenia
 Sveti Jurij ob Ščavnici, a settlement in the Municipality of Sveti Jurij ob Ščavnici (known as Videm from 1953 to 1997), northeastern Slovenia
 Veliki Videm, a settlement in the Municipality of Trebnje, southeastern Slovenia
 Videm, Dobrepolje, a settlement in the Municipality of Dobrepolje, southern Slovenia
 Videm, Dol pri Ljubljani, a settlement in the Municipality of Dol pri Ljubljani, central Slovenia
 Videm, Ivančna Gorica, a former settlement in the Municipality of Ivančna Gorica, central Slovenia
 Videm, Krško, a settlement in the Municipality of Krško, southeastern Slovenia
 Videm pri Lukovici, a settlement in the Municipality of Lukovica, central Slovenia
 Videm pri Ptuju, a settlement in the Municipality of Videm, northeastern Slovenia
 Videm pri Temenici, a settlement in the Municipality of Ivančna Gorica, southeastern Slovenia

People
Vibeke Videm (born 1957), Norwegian physician